Merlin Surget (born 3 December 1999) is a French snowboarder. He competed in the 2018 Winter Olympics.

References

1999 births
Living people
Snowboarders at the 2018 Winter Olympics
Snowboarders at the 2022 Winter Olympics
French male snowboarders
Olympic snowboarders of France
Snowboarders at the 2016 Winter Youth Olympics
People from Chamonix
Sportspeople from Haute-Savoie
21st-century French people